David Bourgeois is a composer, producer, drummer, sound designer, and voice over director from Upstate New York.

Sound Design and voice over

Voice Coaches
Bourgeois is the President and Creative Director of Voice Coaches, a voice-over training company based in Albany, New York. Company services include voice-over and communication training as well as voice-over recording and production.

Television
Bourgeois has contributed voice-over production and editing services to multiple television projects, including episodes of HGTV's FreeStyle and TLC's While You Were Out.

Film
From 1997 to present, Bourgeois has also contributed sound editing and voice-over production to a variety of short and feature-length film projects.

Music production

Bridge Road Entertainment
Bourgeois, along with his wife Anna, is the co-owner of Bridge Road Entertainment, an entertainment production and development company based in Albany, New York. Bridge Road Entertainment's current artist roster includes sibling blues-rock musicians Jocelyn and Chris Arndt. Bourgeois acts as manager and producer.

Jocelyn and Chris
Since he began working with Jocelyn and Chris in 2013, they have recorded and produced a studio EP (Strangers in Fairyland), two full-length albums (Edges and Go), and a live LP (30,000 Miles).

A musician himself, Bourgeois also contributed drumming, percussion, and synthesizer programming to these releases.

In May 2017, Jocelyn and Chris Arndt released Go, a full-length record produced and recorded by Bourgeois at White Lake Music & Post in Albany, New York.

The album includes single "Footprints on the Moon," which was Billboard's 5th most added Adult Album Alternative track in the nation the week of its release to radio, and "Red Stops Traffic," which debuted on the Billboard AAA Top 40 Indicator Chart at No. 37 in December 2017. "Red Stops Traffic" remained in the Top 40 for six weeks total, peaking at No. 35.

The first month of its release, Go appeared at No. 2 on the Relix National Jamband Top 30 Chart. It remained in the No. 2 position through July, dropping to No. 9 in August and No. 10 in September. The album fell off the chart in October 2017, reappearing at No. 17 in November.

On February 22, 2019, Jocelyn and Chris released a new full-length album produced by Bourgeois. Titled The Fun in the Fight, it features eleven original tracks and guest players including Danny Louis of Gov't Mule, Cory Wong of Vulfpeck, and Beau Sasser of Kung Fu. The first week of its release, it reached #1 on the Relix Jambands Top 30 Album Chart. It also debuted at #50 on the AMA Albums Chart. In subsequent weeks, "Outta My Head" broke into the Billboard Triple A Indicator Top 40, peaking at #33. On June 10, the second single from The Fun in the Fight, "Kill in the Cure," impacted radio, where it was the #1 Most Added Single to Triple A radio in its first week. Following this debut, it entered the Triple A Indicator Top 40, peaking at #29.

On March 7, 2019, Bourgeois appeared with Jocelyn & Chris and their band to perform their song "Outta My Head" live on NBC's Today Show.

On February 14, 2020, Jocelyn and Chris released One Night in November, a collection of acoustic re-imaginings of several previously released tracks in addition to one new original song. The entire album was produced by Bourgeois and recorded in front of an intimate audience at White Lake Studios in Upstate New York. The new original track, titled "Mercy Me," was premiered by American Songwriter, who praised the entire LP's "raw, impressive intimacy" and noted that the acoustic format of the record "allows the band to lean into and further explore each song's unshakable roots." Following its release, One Night in November debuted on the Relix Jambands Top 30 Album Chart at #27 in February, reaching #1 in March and then moving back to #22 in April.

On June 17, 2021, Jocelyn and Chris's new single "Sugar and Spice" and its accompanying music video premiered with American Songwriter, who called the track "pure American-rock-goodness."

Vinny Michaels
Country artist Vinny Michaels signed with Bourgeois under Bridge Road Entertainment in 2018. Since then, he has debuted one single titled "Crazy," with plans to release his first full-length album in the spring.

Past artists
Bridge Road Entertainment previously managed and developed country singer-songwriter Chelsea Cavanaugh, whose debut LP Simply was released in 2013.

Production discography

White Lake Music and Post
In 2010, Bourgeois and his wife Anna opened White Lake Music & Post, a recording and post-production facility located in Schenectady. The facility is named after White Lake in the Adirondack Mountains, where the Bourgeois family has had a camp for three generations.

Personal life
Bourgeois is originally from Boonville, New York. A self-proclaimed "music geek," he played percussion in a variety of groups and ensembles throughout elementary and high school. He credits much of his current success to his parents' support for his early decision to pursue a career in the arts:

At age twenty, Bourgeois moved to Albany in pursuit of his musical interests, performing and recording in multiple area bands and studying percussion and electronic music at the University at Albany. He soon began to gain studio experience as well, starting with recording and composition for singer-songwriters and commercial advertising and progressing to projects that cemented his role as a music producer.

References

External links 
David Bourgeois at AllMusic
David R. Bourgeois at IMDb

Year of birth missing (living people)
Living people
Musicians from New York (state)
People from Boonville, New York
American music managers
Record producers from New York (state)